The 2007 PartyBets.com Grand Slam of Darts was the inaugural staging of the darts tournament, the Grand Slam of Darts, held by the Professional Darts Corporation. The tournament invited the best performing players from the PDC and its rival the British Darts Organisation. There had been two previous head-to-head matches between the champions of the two organisations and a few tournaments have also featured BDO v PDC clashes. This tournament was the first of its kind to be held in the United Kingdom.

The 2007 tournament was staged at the Wolverhampton Civic Hall, Wolverhampton, England from 17–25 November 2007. Phil Taylor won the title, beating Andy Hamilton 18–11 in the final. In one of the early group matches which may not have stood out at the time, John Part narrowly beat Mark Webster 5–4 and less than two months later the two players became the World Champions of their respective organisations.

Format
The 32 players were split into eight groups of four players with the top two from each group qualifying for the last 16 knockout stages. Each player was therefore guaranteed three matches in the competition. Two points were awarded for a win. All group games were best of 9 legs, the second-round games were extended to best of 19 legs, the semi-finals best of 25 legs, and the final best of 35 legs.

Prize money
PartyPoker.net increased the prize fund for the event from the original announcement of £250,000 to £300,000 making it the second richest tournament in 2007 – ahead of both the Premier League and the BDO World Championship.

Controversy
Controversy hit the tournament in May when it was confirmed by the BDO that the Winmau World Masters had been moved from its original dates of 26–28 October to a new date of 16–18 November, clashing directly with the Grand Slam. This meant that players from the BDO were forced into a direct choice between competing at the Masters for valuable ranking points or taking their place at the Grand Slam for better prize money. BDO World Champion Martin Adams almost immediately confirmed that he would participate in the Masters, though he was the only BDO player to do so. Adams went out in the quarter-finals of the World Masters meaning his pay cheque of £1,250 was significantly less than the £4,000 he would have received simply for turning up at the Grand Slam. Adams also declined the chance to compete in 2008, even though the two tournaments did not clash as the Masters was moved to December.

Qualifiers
The PDC Chairman Barry Hearn announced on 21 February 2007 that all major tournament finalists for the past two years from both the BDO and PDC will be invited to the event. Also World Championship semi-finalists from the same period would receive an invite.

The tournaments used for the qualifying criteria were the two World Championships, the World Matchplay, World Grand Prix and World Masters (2006 only), UK Open, Las Vegas Desert Classic, Premier League, World Series of Darts, International Darts League and the World Darts Trophy with the field set at 32 players.

BDO players Gary Anderson, Mark Webster, Shaun Greatbatch, Niels de Ruiter, Phill Nixon and Scott Waites all accepted invites to the event leaving Martin Adams (the BDO World Champion) as the only player to have rejected the opportunity to play. He participated in the 2007 Winmau World Masters instead, losing at the quarter-final stage.

PDC

BDO

Defunct Tournaments

Other qualifiers

Draws

Group stages
All matches race-to-5/best of 9.

NB in Brackets: Number = Seeds; BDO = BDO Darts player; RQ = Ranking qualifier; Q = Qualifier
NB: P = Played; W = Won; L = Lost; LF = Legs for; LA = Legs against; +/- = Plus/minus record, in relation to legs; Average = 3-dart average; Pts = Points

Group A

17 November

18 November

19 November

Group B 

17 November

18 November

19 November

Group C 

17 November

18 November

19 November

Group D 

17 November

18 November

19 November

Group E 

17 November

18 November

20 November

Group F 

17 November

18 November

20 November

Group G 

17 November

18 November

20 November

Group H 

17 November

18 November

20 November

Knockout stages

Statistics

Television coverage
The tournament was televised by ITV. The first afternoon session on 17 November, the Sunday afternoon session on 18 November, the semi-finals, and the final were all be broadcast live on ITV1. The rest of the tournament was shown live on ITV4. It was ITV's first televised darts tournament since they ceased coverage of the Winmau World Masters in 1988 – although they did show the first Clash of Champions match between Phil Taylor and Raymond van Barneveld in 1999.

The ITV Sport team consisted of lead presenter Matt Smith, analysts Steve Beaton and Alan Warriner-Little, and commentators John Rawling from ITV Boxing, Stuart Pyke from Sky Sports and Nigel Pearson of talkSPORT.

References

External links
Announcement of tournament PlanetDarts.tv

Grand Slam of Darts
Grand Slam of Darts
Grand Slam of Darts
Grand Slam of Darts